Chattogram-16 is a constituency represented in the Jatiya Sangsad (National Parliament) of Bangladesh since 2014 by Mustafizur Rahman Chowdhury of the Awami League.

Boundaries 
The constituency encompasses Banshkhali Upazila.

History 
The constituency was created when, ahead of the 2008 general election, the Election Commission redrew constituency boundaries to reflect population changes revealed by the 2001 Bangladesh census. The 2008 redistricting added a new seat to Chattogram District, increasing the number of constituencies in the district to 16. The seat for Sandwip Upazila was renumbered from Chittagong-3 to Chittagong-16, and seats 2 through 7 were shuffled around so that the three metropolitan seats (Chittagong-8, 9, and 10) could be split into four (Chittagong-7, 8, 9, and 10).

Ahead of the 2014 general election, the Election Commission renumbered the seat for Sandwip Upazila from Chattogram-16 back to Chittagong-3, bumping up by one the suffix of the former constituency of that name and the higher numbered constituencies in the district. Thus Chattogram-16 covers the area covered in 2008 by Chittagong-15.

Members of Parliament

Elections

Elections in the 2010s

Elections in the 2000s

References

External links
 

Parliamentary constituencies in Bangladesh
Chittagong District